So Fresh: The Hits of Spring 2015 is a compilation album which has 22 tracks. The album was released on 11 September 2015, and peaked at number one on the ARIA Compilations Chart.
The album has been certified gold for shipment of 35,000 units.

Track listing

Bonus DVD
5 Seconds of Summer – "She's Kinda Hot"
Delta Goodrem – "Wings"
Lost Frequencies – "Are You with Me"
The Weeknd – "Can't Feel My Face"
Silentó – "Watch Me (Whip/Nae Nae)"
Jessie J – "Flashlight"
Vance Joy – Fire and the Flood"
Fifth Harmony featuring Kid Ink – "Worth It"
Avicii – "Waiting for Love"
Years & Years – "Shine"
Pharrell Williams – "Freedom"
Sam Feldt featuring Kimberly Anne – "Show Me Love"

Charts

Certifications

References

2015 in Australian music
2015 compilation albums
So Fresh albums
2015 video albums
Music video compilation albums